Genrikh Saulovich Altshuller (Ге́нрих Сау́лович Альтшу́ллер) (born Tashkent, Uzbek SSR, USSR, 15 October 1926; died Petrozavodsk, Russia, 24 September 1998), was a Soviet engineer, inventor, and writer. He is most notable for the creation of the Theory of Inventive Problem Solving, better known by its Russia acronym TRIZ. He founded the Azerbaijan Public Institute for Inventive Creation, and was the first President of the TRIZ Association. He also wrote science fiction under the pen-name Genrikh Altov.

Early life
Working as a clerk in a patent office, Altshuller embarked on finding some generic rules that would explain creation of new, inventive, patentable ideas. He eventually created the Teoriya Resheniya Izobreatatelskikh Zadach (Theory of Inventive Problem Solving or TRIZ)).

Arrest and imprisonment
During Joseph Stalin's political purges of members of the Communist Party in 1950, he was imprisoned for political reasons and continued his studies with his fellow inmates while in a labor camp. After his release in 1954, Altshuller settled in Baku, Azerbaijan.

The spread of TRIZ in the Soviet Union
A full-fledged TRIZ movement developed among Soviet engineers and other technically inclined people by the 1970s, and Altshuller played the role of its intellectual leader. He lectured at TRIZ congresses, published articles and books and corresponded with various TRIZ practitioners. He became the founding member and president of the Russian TRIZ Association. A number of his close friends and students have become the most prominent thinkers and teachers of the movement, popularizing TRIZ in Russia and abroad. 

For a long time he published articles on TRIZ, with examples and exercises, in the Soviet popular science magazine Izobretatel i Ratsionalizator (Inventor and Innovator).

After the Soviet collapse
Altshuller left Baku in the early 1990s amidst post-Soviet-breakup violence in the area. He settled in Petrozavodsk (Karelia in north-western Russia) with his wife and granddaughter. As a result, Petrozavodsk became the center of the TRIZ Association.

He die from complications of Parkinson's disease in 1998.

Science Fiction
Following his release from prison camp in the 1950s, he earned a living as a science fiction writer, under the pseudonym Genrikh Altov (Генрих Альтов), often in collaboration with his wife, Valentina Zhuravleva.

Science fiction published as Genrich Altov 
Икар и Дедал 1958 (Icarus and Daedalus)
Легенды о звездных капитанах 1961 (Legends of Starship Captains)
Опаляющий разум 1968 (Scorching Mind)
Создан для бури 1970 (Made for the Storm)
Летящие по Вселенной 2002, with Valentina Zhuravleva (They Who Fly Through Space)

External links
 Full Biography
 
 

1926 births
1998 deaths
Deaths from Parkinson's disease
Patent examiners
Altov, Genrich
Systems engineers
Soviet engineers
Soviet science fiction writers
Neurological disease deaths in Russia
Engineers from Tashkent
Engineers from Baku
TRIZ
Soviet novelists
Soviet male writers
20th-century male writers
Soviet Jews
Soviet essayists
Writers from Baku